Mesodina hayi, the small iris-skipper, is a butterfly of the family Hesperiidae. It is endemic to the north-west and south-west coast of the state of Western Australia.

The wingspan is about 30 mm.

The larvae feed on Patersonia drummondii. They construct a tent-like shelter made by joining the leaves of its host plant with silk, where it rests during the day. Pupation takes place inside the shelter.

External links
Australian Insects
Australian Faunal Directory

Trapezitinae
Butterflies described in 1995